Robert van Sice is an American percussionist and marimba player.  He has toured and recorded extensively, currently teaches at the Yale School of Music (where he was appointed Director of Percussion Studies in 1997) and the Peabody Conservatory of Music, and was recently invited to join the faculty of the Curtis Institute of Music. In addition to being a strong teacher and performer, Van Sice has his own line of marimba mallets by Vic Firth, and a line of signature marimbas by Adams Musical Instruments.

An important figure in the European percussion community for many years, Van Sice gave the first solo marimba recital at Amsterdam's Concertgebouw in 1989 and taught at the Rotterdam Conservatorium and Darmstädter Ferienkurse.

Among his former students are the four members of the chamber group So Percussion.

References

External links
 Peabody Institute - Robert van Sice
 Robert van Sice videos on YouTube

American male musicians
American percussionists
Yale School of Music faculty
American marimbists
Living people
Peabody Institute faculty
Year of birth missing (living people)